Zorro is a 1975 swashbuckler Spaghetti Western Italian/French international co-production film based on the character created by Johnston McCulley, The film was directed by Duccio Tessari and stars Alain Delon in the title role. It was shot in Almería, Spain. Ottavia Piccolo and Stanley Baker also star, with Zorro being Baker's final film before his death in 1976. The film was released by United Artists on March 5, 1975 and was both a critical and commercial success.

Plot 
On the eve of his return to Spain from Alta California, Don Diego de la Vega meets his old friend Miguel de la Serna, who is about to take up the governorship of Nueva Aragón. His uncle Don Fernando has died of “malaria” in a malaria-free region, being replaced by the dictatorial and unscrupulous  Colonel Huerta. Diego warns, in vain, the idealistic Miguel that Nueva Aragón is ruled by greed and hatred; later that very evening, Miguel is assassinated by Huerta's underlings. Diego vows to avenge Miguel by taking his place, but not before a dying Miguel makes Diego swear "the new governor will never kill".

As Colonel Huerta asks the local council to appoint him both military and civil governor of Nueva Aragón, Diego suddenly arrives, walking in disguised as de la Serna. While lulling Colonel Huerta's fears by pretending to be a useless fop, Diego learns that Huerta is a cruel despot, as well as a dangerous swordsman.

With Joaquín, Miguel's devoted mute servant, and aided by Assassin, the late Don Fernando's Great Dane, Diego goes among the people and learns how miserable and afraid they are: the innocent are punished for speaking the truth, while the guilty, who cheat unmercifully, are labelled as “respectable” citizens.

Inspired by street urchin Chico's tales of Zorro, a freedom-loving fox spirit, Diego creates his own black-garbed alter ego and launches a campaign for justice with a hilarious, action-packed marketplace brawl. Outwitting Huerta and his men time and again, Diego finally stages his own kidnapping (as the region's governor and as Zorro), both to free wrongfully held prisoners and to trick Colonel Huerta into thinking both are now dead.

Huerta, feeling himself safe at last, forces aristocrat Hortensia Polido to the marriage altar. He shoots Brother Francisco when the monk leads protesters to the church steps, just as Zorro reappears. Brother Francisco's murder finally absolves Diego of his vow to his dead friend Miguel, leaving Zorro free to engage Huerta in an action-packed swordplay duel-to-the-death, at which he is victorious following a lengthy battle.

Cast

Production
The film was made in part because Alain Delon had enjoyed making the swashbuckler The Black Tulip in 1964 and wanted to do another one. Filming began in July 1974 in Spain, with most of the crew being from Italy. Some studio work was done in Rome. The film's lengthy sword duel at the end was inspired by Scaramouche (1952).

Release
Zorro was released in France on 5 March 1975 and in Italy on 6 March. It was released in the United States in June 1976 by United Artists.

It was also one of the first Western-produced films to be screened in the People's Republic of China, after the Cultural Revolution. It was released there in 1978, and was purportedly seen by more than 70 million viewers.

References

Bibliography

External links
 
Review of film at Indiewire

1975 films
1970s adventure comedy films
Italian adventure comedy films
Italian Western (genre) films
French adventure comedy films
French Western (genre) comedy films
Spanish Western (genre) films
1975 Western (genre) films
Spaghetti Western films
1970s English-language films
English-language Italian films
English-language French films
1970s French-language films
1970s Italian-language films
Zorro films
Films directed by Duccio Tessari
Films scored by Guido & Maurizio De Angelis
Films shot in Almería
1975 multilingual films
Films based on works by Johnston McCulley
Films shot in Rome
Italian swashbuckler films
Films shot in Madrid
Italian multilingual films
French multilingual films
1970s Spanish films
1970s Italian films
1970s French films